Wieseltier is a Jewish surname. Notable persons with that name include:

Meir Wieseltier, a prize-winning Israeli poet and translator
Leon Wieseltier,  a Jewish American writer, critic, and magazine editor

Jewish surnames
German-language surnames